Aspergillus aureolatus is a species of fungus in the genus Aspergillus. It is from the Nidulantes section. The species was first described in 1964. It was isolated from air in Belgrade, Serbia.

Growth and morphology
A. aureolatus has been cultivated on both Czapek yeast extract agar (CYA) plates and Malt Extract Agar Oxoid® (MEAOX) plates. The growth morphology of the colonies can be seen in the pictures below.

References 

aureolatus
Fungi described in 1964